Slamball is a form of basketball played with four trampolines in front of each net and boards around the court edge. The name SlamBall is the trademark of SlamBall, LLC. While SlamBall is based on basketball, it is a contact sport, with blocks, collisions and rough physical play a part of the game, similar to elements of American football and ice hockey.

Professional SlamBall games aired on television with Spike TV for two seasons in 2002–2003, and the POWERade SlamBall Challenge was aired on CSTV, now CBS Sports Network, in 2007. SlamBall returned in August 2008, airing on Versus, now NBC Sports Network, and CBS. The 2008 SlamBall season aired at one point on weekends on Cartoon Network. Slamball was shown on One HD in Australia during 2009. SlamBall held its first major international tournament in China in 2012.

History

SlamBall was invented in 1999 by Mason Gordon, who was working at the time for Tollin/Robbins Productions and had written episodes for the television shows Kenan & Kel and Cousin Skeeter. The name SlamBall is owned by Gordon's company.  Inspired by video games, Gordon sketched an idea on a napkin for a sport that combined several existent ones. He approached his boss, movie and television producer Mike Tollin, who liked the idea and thought Gordon was "onto something." Tollin helped finance the construction of a prototype court in an East Los Angeles warehouse six months later.

Gordon then tried to convince street basketball players to test his new idea; he wanted to find skilled, strong players who could compete comfortably while launching off trampolines and crashing into each other in mid-air.

Five recruits—James Willis, Sean Jackson, David Redmond, Michael Goldman and Jeff Sheridan—trained with Gordon to produce the first games. These original six players were part of the first two teams, the Los Angeles Rumble and the Chicago Mob. These two teams played an exhibition series in 2001, which the Chicago Mob won. Soon, more players were brought in, including Stan Fletcher, Rob Wilson and Dion Mays.

First played in Los Angeles, the game gained attention from street basketball players in the area. Within a year, 400 people had been enlisted as potential players. Open tryouts were held and the selection of players based on athletic ability, body control and court awareness started. Reducing numbers to about 60 players, the first ever SlamBall combine was held where players and coaches learned safety, the game and basic strategy.

In 2002, SlamBall made its television debut, on The National Network (later Spike TV and now the Paramount Network), soon after former Philadelphia 76ers owner Pat Croce had signed on as a partner. Six teams (the Bouncers, Diablos, Mob, Rumble, Slashers, and Steal) played in the inaugural season. Former NBA All-Star Reggie Theus served as studio co-host and color commentator. ReelSports served as the event organizers for the new league. SlamBall also aired on the British television station Trouble and ESPN aired a feature on the new league.

After the second season in 2003, SlamBall creator Mason Gordon and co-producer Telepictures Productions had a disagreement. The league was dissolved. Five years later the league resurfaced for one more season. The league opened its doors to open try-outs.

The first SlamBall draft in 2002 saw Canadian Robert Wilson drafted as the first No. 1 pick ever in the sport.
Before the second season of SlamBall debuted on the newly renamed Spike TV, two expansion teams (the Riders and Bandits) were added and a new court was built at Universal City, California. One notable player on the Bandits was Craig Skistimas, who would later go on to co-create the video game entertainment channel ScrewAttack!

In 2007, the  "POWERADE SlamBall Challenge" took place at Hoop City, a fan interactive event, at the 2007 Final Four in Atlanta, Georgia, and aired on CSTV in April 2007.

In Italy SlamBall made its debut on Italia 1 on 16 July 2007.

In 2008, SlamBall began planning for a new season, to be financed by IMG. The league accepted applications through its website for new players and coaches, and tryouts were held in three U.S. cities in April, 2008. A training camp for the 2008 season of SlamBall was held at IMG Academy in Bradenton, Florida from April to June 2008. Over 100 potential players participated in tryouts, eventually leaving 64 players after an 8-team draft. The league was cut to the 6 current teams. Some figures associated with the new season of SlamBall include: Commissioner Pat Croce and Coaches Kenny Anderson, John Starks, Raghib Ismail and Ken Carter. In summer 2008, SlamBall played its first season since 2003 at Universal Citywalk in Universal Studios, California. These games aired in a "Game of the Week" format on Versus beginning 31 August and led up to the finals on CBS on 2 November 2008.

In the 2008 season championship, the Slashers, led by Kevin Stapleton, defeated the Rumble. The coach of the Rumble was Ken Carter, of the famed Coach Carter. The season aired on Australia's One HD and Fuel TV.

In August 2022 Mason Gordon announced that Slamball would be making a comeback with a new season in 2023.

Rules and regulations

Scoring is achieved by putting the ball into the net at the opponent's end of the court for points, while preventing the opposing team from doing the same at one's own net. The aim is to have outscored the opposing team when the game ends. A successful score can be worth two points if the ball is thrown through the hoop without the offensive player touching the hoop. Slam dunks are scored three points. All shots outside the three-point arc are worth three points as well. Four players from each team (out of an 8-10 player roster) may be on the court at one time. Substitutions are unlimited and can be done during play (as in the game of hockey). Each team has a coach and additional staff which includes assistant coaches, managers, statisticians, doctors, etc.

The game is controlled by two referees and the table officials. The table keeps track of the score, time, team possessions, fouls and the shot clock.

Playing regulations

Games are played in four 5-minute quarters, unlike the NBA, which plays for four 12-minute quarters. The game commences with a "bounce-off" in which the ball is bounced at center court. The ball must reach its apex uninterrupted, at which point the players are allowed to "check" each other. Ten minutes are allowed for a half-time break; only one time-out is permitted to each team, which may only be used during the last two minutes of regulation play. A 15-second shot clock is utilized. Teams change ends for the second half. A tie score at the end of regulation time is settled by a series of "face offs" (see Fouls below).

Positions

Each team has four players on the court at any one time. There are three positions:

Handler: This is the primary ball handler on the team. It is his job to run the offense and organize the other members while controlling the flow of the game. Typically he would be responsible to set up the gunners to attack the basket while adding in his own offensive threat, comparable to a point guard in basketball.
Gunner: The primary scorer on the team. A team's gunner will be the player on the team that will attack the basket and finish plays against the opposing teams' stopper, comparable to a forward or wing player in soccer or hockey. 
Stopper: This position is for the primary defensive player. He trails the offense only when necessary, and he protects the rim from attacking players by using himself as a shield. Goaltending is legal if the shot attempt is from inside the trampoline area.

Teams are free to choose their own configuration, the usual formations being 1 stopper, 2 handlers, and 1 gunner OR 1 stopper, 1 handler, and 2 gunners.

Fouls

Each player can commit just three personal fouls before he is removed from the match (unlike in the NBA, where it is six personal fouls). A coach or player displaying poor sportsmanship (such as fighting, arguing vehemently against an official) may be charged with a technical foul. Two technical fouls results in a disqualification.

When a foul is called, the player who has committed it will then take position on the baseline of the lower trampolines while the player who was offended will take up offensive position at center court. This is called a face-off. Upon a signal from the referee the offensive player will be free to mount an attack at the basket, which the defender now must endeavor to stop. The defender must enter the lower trampoline only after bouncing in from the side trampoline. If the offensive player is successful, then points will be awarded depending on the shot converted and the offensive players' team will retain possession of the ball. In the case of any tie-ups, the defensive team always gain possession, but if the shot was blocked, the offensive team retains the ball from center court.

List of common fouls:
When an offensive player has the ball and a defensive player checks him in the back. Result: Faceoff
When an offensive player has the ball and a defensive player checks him before he has begun to dribble the ball. Result: Faceoff
When an offensive player has the ball and a defensive player checks him while he is attempting to enter the trampoline. Result: Faceoff
When two offensive players step/bounce on the same trampoline. Result: Turnover
When an offensive player bounces on a trampoline twice while in possession of the ball. Result: Turnover
When either a Player or the Coach of a team argues with the referee and uses physical or verbal abuse in anger. Result: Can either be a Faceoff or Turnover (referee decides)
When two players from the same team are on the same island or trampoline, or 'station' as it is called. Result: Turnover
Three-second violation: When any offensive player is stationed in an island area (sides of trampolines) for three seconds. Result: Turnover
When a shot is attempted from an island.  Result: Turnover
When the defense holds position on an island, a charge can be called against the opposition. Result: Turnover.
Popcorn effect: When a defensive player deliberately interferes with the offensive player's bounce, caused by standing on the offensive player's landing spot to cause the equivalent of a trip in basketball.  Result: Faceoff

Equipment

 The spring floor lies adjacent to two sets of four trampoline or spring bed 'quads' which dominate each end of the court. Each trampoline surface measures .) The shock absorbent panels pair with the competition bed trampolines to create a unique playing surface that both launches players to inhuman heights and cushions their landing upon returning to the floor. Specifically engineered pads are designed to cover the frame rails and their tapered design allows for maximum safety for on-court play. This entire playing surface will be surrounded with an  Plexiglass wall much like in a hockey rink. Players wear protective cups and special equipment to protect various areas of the body. This consists of knee and elbow pads, and an optional SlamBall-specific helmet.

Slamball launches in China

In 2015 Slamball resurfaced in China. After what appeared to be an extended courtship with the Chinese government, and community at large, new Slamball facilities began construction throughout China. Eventually, the new partnership with Chinese entities created five teams to officially expand the league to Asia. Slamball creator Mason Gordon did exhaustive leg work advancing the process. In 2015 all Gordon's hard work would pay off as Slamball started capturing the attention of the Chinese public.

According to a report published by Vice Sports, Mason Gordon was quoted as saying, "We never left, we just needed to take the best path for us." There were even talks of Slamball college teams in the coming years.

Media exposure
On television, the sport has been seen on The Tonight Show with Jay Leno, One Tree Hill, CBS's King of Queens, Method & Red, ESPN's SportsCenter, The Best Damn Sports Show Period and Fuel TV. In print, SlamBall has been featured in The New York Times, Sports Illustrated, USA Today, Time and European editions of Maxim, GQ and FHM.

Athletes and training

Because of the nature of SlamBall, a broad scope is considered in the recruitment of the players. New players for the League have come from various areas. SlamBall has recruited players directly from college and pro basketball programs across the country. Football players are used to the full-contact, up-tempo style of play, and many of the better players of SlamBall found their origins on the gridiron.

Teams

Current

Winner of a one off tournament*

Inactive

Seasons

2002

2003

2007 Powerade Slamball Challenge

2008

Past champions

Unofficial Season*

Popular culture
 In the 1989 movie Back to the Future Part II, "Slamball" was mentioned as one of Douglas J. Needles' favorite sports during a scene that took place in 2015. This fact was listed in the databank captions shown on the videophone screen during a call between him and Marty McFly. Slamball was also mentioned on the front page of a 2015 USA Today newspaper. The movie was released 13 years before SlamBall was ultimately founded in 2002.	
In The King of Queens episode "Knee Jerk," Doug Heffernan lies to his wife Carrie about having a knee injury but is ultimately caught when she finds him playing SlamBall with his friends.	
In the One Tree Hill episode "Choosing My Own Way of Life", Nathan is offered a position on a SlamBall team. The storyline ran five episodes and featured several of SlamBall's top players.
SlamBall was covered on VH1's Best Week Ever.
ScrewAttack! and Game Attack founder Craig Skistimas is a former player.

References

External links
 
 
 SlamBall Asia Official Site
 POWERade SlamBall Challenge Official Site
 Tollin/Robbins Productions
 IMG Programming Official Site – SlamBall
 SlamBall UK Fansite
 SlamBall TV
 SlamBall 2008 Videos
 

 
Ball games
Forms of basketball
Sports originating in the United States
Games and sports introduced in 2001